Reinhardtsdorf Sandstone (also Oberquader or Hauptsandstein) is quarried in the vicinity of Reinhardtsdorf near Pirna in the district of Sächsische Schweiz-Osterzgebirge in the German Free State of Saxony. It is the so-called main sandstone of the Elbe sandstones, and was formed in the Middle Turonian. In 2008 there was one quarry that won this particular sandstone.

See also 
 List of sandstones 
 Cotta Sandstone
 Posta Sandstone 
 Wehlen Sandstone

References

Sources 
W. Dienemann und O. Burre: Die nutzbaren Gesteine Deutschlands und ihre Lagerstätten mit Ausnahme der Kohlen, Erze und Salze, Enke-Verlag, Stuttgart 1929. 
 Siegfried Grunert: Der Elbsandstein: Vorkommen, Verwendung, Eigenschaften. In: Geologica Saxonica Journal of Central European Geology 52/53 (2007), p. 143-204 (Digitalisat)

External links 
Technical data of Reinhardtsdorf Sandstone
Citizen's initiative against a quarry in the Alte Poste valley

Sandstone
Elbe Sandstone Mountains
Quarries in Germany
Sächsische Schweiz-Osterzgebirge
Reinhardtsdorf-Schöna